PT Unicor Prima Motor is a joint venture between Chery Automobile Co. Ltd. and Indomobil Group for the assembly and distribution of cars for the local market. The company is located in Jakarta, Indonesia and was founded in December 2006.

External links
 Official Chery—Unicor Prima Motor website 

Car manufacturers of Indonesia
Chery
Manufacturing companies based in Jakarta
Vehicle manufacturing companies established in 2006
Indonesian companies established in 2006

de:IndoMobil Group#Unicor Prima Motor, PT.